In a PCI Express (PCIe) system, a root complex device connects the CPU and memory subsystem to the PCI Express switch fabric composed of one or more PCIe or PCI devices. 

Similar to a host bridge in a PCI system, the root complex generates transaction requests on behalf of the CPU, which is interconnected through a local bus. Root complex functionality may be integrated in the chipset and/or the CPU. A root complex may contain more than one PCI Express port and multiple switch devices can be connected to ports on the root complex or cascaded.

Device Memory Map 

The PCIE Root Complex holds a master copy of a 'Type 1 Configuration Table' that defines the host memory space that is accessible from each Endpoint device.  In addition, each PCIE Endpoint device holds a master copy of their own memory space map in the host system memory as a 'Type 0 Configuration Table', this configuration table in each device allows the host to access the local memory of a PCIe device. Both the Type 1 and Type 0 configuration tables are set up by the Host Operating System that controls the Root Complex by a process known as enumeration and which acts to build a device memory map for the system by querying each bridge, and endpoint device connected on the bus network.  Similarly, a PCIE Bridge acts a tiered root complex with a "Type 0 Configuration Table".

References

Peripheral Component Interconnect